Pakistan and Bangladesh are both South Asian Muslim-majority countries. Following the end of British rule in India, the two countries formed a single state for 24 years. The Bangladesh Liberation War in 1971 resulted in the secession of East Pakistan as the People's Republic of Bangladesh. Pakistan (formerly West Pakistan) recognized Bangladesh in 1974 after pressure from across the world.

The two countries are both founding members of SAARC, as well as members of the Developing 8 Countries, the OIC and the Commonwealth of Nations. Both are classified as Next Eleven emerging economies. Bangladesh has a High Commission in Islamabad and Deputy High Commission in Karachi. Pakistan has a High Commission in Dhaka.

History

Liberation

As part of the Partition of India in 1947, Bengal was partitioned between the Dominion of India and the Dominion of Pakistan. The Pakistani part of Bengal was known as East Bengal until 1955 and thereafter as East Pakistan following the implementation of the One Unit program.

Bilateral relations between the two wings grew strained over the lack of official recognition for the Bengali language, democracy, regional autonomy, disparity between the two wings, ethnic discrimination, and the central government's weak and inefficient relief efforts after the 1970 Bhola cyclone, which had affected millions in East Pakistan. These grievances led to several political agitations in East Bengal and ultimately a fight for full independence. In early March 1971, 300 Biharis were slaughtered in rioting by Bengali mobs in Chittagong. The massacre was used by the Pakistan Armed Forces as a justification to launch "Operation Searchlight", which targeted intellectuals, political activists, Hindus and other minorities. The number of people killed by Pakistani forces remains disputed, with estimates ranging from 300,000 to 3 million. About 8-10 million people became refugees in India. Many Bengali policemen and soldiers mutinied and nationalists formed a guerrilla force, the Mukti Bahini with Soviet and Indian support. When a declared war broke out between West Pakistan and East Pakistan in December 1971, the joint forces of Mukti Bahini and Indian Army later known as Bangladesh Armed forces defeated Pakistani forces in East Pakistan and the independent state of Bangladesh was created.

Mukti Bahini, the Bengali resistance force, backed by Indian government, from East Pakistan, killed non-Bengalis (primarily West Pakistanis and Biharis) in the aftermath of the Bangladesh Liberation War.

1974–2012: Establishment and growth of bilateral relations

The left-oriented Pakistan Peoples Party (PPP) led by Zulfikar Ali Bhutto, who had been the main political opponent of Sheikh Mujibur Rahman, came into power in the aftermath of Bangladesh's separation from Pakistan. Initially, Pakistan was not in favour of recognizing Bangladesh and urged other states to hold back their recognition until Pakistan could enter into a dialogue with Bangladeshi leadership. Bangladesh, on its part, insisted on recognition as a pre-condition for dialogue. In 1972, Pakistan left the Commonwealth after some members of the Commonwealth extended membership to Bangladesh. Pakistan also severed ties with other countries which recognized Bangladesh.

On the issue of Bangladesh's application for membership to the UN, China, on Pakistan's request, exercised its veto power for the first time to stall the move, which helped Pakistan to secure in a bargain the release of its prisoners of war and the return of troops to their pre-war positions.

In 1974, the relationship between Bangladesh and Pakistan thawed. Sheikh Mujibur Rahman withdrew the bans on some pro-Pakistan organisations that had operated before Bangladesh's independence. Mujib visited Lahore for an OIC Islamic summit, and in return the Parliament of Pakistan authorised Bhutto to extend recognition to Bangladesh. In June 1974, Pakistani Prime Minister Zulfiqar Ali Bhutto visited Bangladesh and paid homage to Bangladesh's war memorial at Savar Upazila. Both nations discussed an agreement in 1975 in which Bangladesh agreed to take up half of Pakistan's pre-1971 external reserves provided Bangladesh received half of the country's pre-1971 assets and credit went unresolved.

Relations improved considerably under the governments of Ziaur Rahman and Hossain Mohammad Ershad in Bangladesh, which had grown more distant from its usual allies, like India and Russia. Five Pakistani heads of government have made official visits to Bangladesh since the 1980s and numerous trade and cultural agreements have been signed. Common concerns over terrorism have influenced strategic cooperation leading to a gift of several squadrons of F-6 fighter aircraft to the Bangladesh Air Force in the late 1980s although there was no serious effort to maintain them as they were later left to be destroyed by a cyclone. Trade between the two countries currently stands at $340 million which was described by the Deputy High Commissioner of Bangladesh, Ruhul Alam Siddique as 'negligible when taking into account the combined population' (of both countries). Areas he hoped would induce investment from Pakistan to Bangladesh included the textiles and energy sectors.

In 1985, Pakistani President Muhammad Zia-ul-Haq visited the Bangladeshi war memorial, and said "Your heroes are our heroes." Bangladeshi President Ershad visited Islamabad in 1986. In 1998, Prime Minister Sheikh Hasina visited Pakistan. In July 2002, Pakistani General Pervez Musharraf also visited the war memorial and said "Your brothers and sisters in Pakistan share the pain of the events of 1971."

In his history of Bangladesh, Craig Baxter gives a general assessment of the relations between both countries:

2013: War crimes tribunal

In December 2013, Bangladeshi Bangladesh Jamaat-e-Islami Islamist leader Abdul Quader Molla, dubbed the "butcher of Mirpur", was executed in Bangladesh for war crimes. Following the execution, the lower house National Assembly of Pakistan issued a statement condemning execution, claiming it to be politically motivated. Pakistan's Interior Minister expressed sadness that Molla was executed for his "loyalty towards Pakistan".

As a result of Pakistan's reactions, Bangladesh summoned the Pakistani High Commissioner, conveying its displeasure at Pakistan's interference in its internal matters. Bangladesh conveyed its displeasure at the National Assembly statement, Punjab Provincial Assembly statement, as well as the remarks by Pakistan's Interior Minister. Protesters in Bangladesh also took to the streets to express their displeasure by marching towards the Pakistan High Commission in Dhaka.

2015–2016: Diplomatic rifts

In two separate incidents, officials of the Pakistani High Commission in Dhaka were alleged to be financing the terrorist activities of the banned Jamaat-ul-Mujahideen Bangladesh organization. Diplomatic official Mazhar Khan was charged by Bangladesh's foreign ministry of running an illegal Indian currency business in Dhaka beside alleged links with militants. However, Pakistan's foreign office maintains that allegations against him are baseless and the incident is unfortunate.

In December 2015, Pakistan withdrew the diplomat Farina Arshad after Bangladeshi authorities asked the diplomat to leave for reportedly having "extended financial support to a suspected militant who faces spying charges". Jama'atul Mujahideen Bangladesh (JMB) operative Idris Sheikh, who also holds Pakistani nationality, had claimed he had received money from her and was in contact with her for some time. Pakistan has withdrawn one of its diplomats from Bangladesh after "harassment", the foreign ministry said. A formal statement from Islamabad dismissed the charges as "baseless", adding "an incessant and orchestrated media campaign was launched against her on spurious charges".

In January 2016, Islamabad asked Dhaka to recall senior diplomat Moushumi Rahman from its High Commission in Islamabad within 48 hours. Diplomatic sources in Islamabad told the media that Rahman was allegedly involved in "anti-state activities in Pakistan" and that concerned security agencies continued to monitor her.

2018 to present

Following the election of Imran Khan as Prime Minister of Pakistan, the two countries have slowly began to normalise ties. Remarkably, Khan made a phone call to Sheikh Hasina in July 2020 following Bangladesh's foreign policy announcement of "friendship to all and malice to none", inviting her to Islamabad. Hasina later mentioned that she was interested in strengthening bilateral ties with Pakistan. Following a meeting with Shahriar Alam on 7 January 2021, the Government of Pakistan removed all Visa requirements for Bangladeshi citizens.

Residency issues

Bangladeshis in Pakistan

There has been a presence of people from modern day Bangladesh in present-day Pakistan going back generations, even during the times of the British Raj. This continued from 1971 onwards and extended into the 1980s when massive numbers of Bangladeshis entered Pakistan. This led to a crackdown by the government of Benazir Bhutto in the 1990s after public resentment and complaints of crime and social unrest. Today there are about an estimated two million unregistered Bangladeshis in Pakistan. There has been a small number of Bangladeshi expatriate students studying in Pakistan but that number has been on the decline mainly due to security concerns in the country.

Biharis in Bangladesh

An issue of continuing controversy is the status and return of Biharis (also called Stranded Pakistanis) to Pakistan. Numbered around 540,000, these communities had migrated to what became East Pakistan from the Indian state of Bihar after the partition of India in 1947. During the liberation war, these communities supported the Pakistani government and later wanted to emigrate to Pakistan, which stalled and hesitated. By 1982 about 127,000 had been repatriated, leaving about 250,000 people still demanding repatriation. In 1985 there was some progress in this area when Pakistani president Zia-ul-Haq agreed to accept the "stranded Pakistanis." In a 2002 visit to Bangladesh, Pakistani president Pervez Musharraf signed numerous bilateral agreements but said he could not allow the emigration of Biharis to Pakistan for the time being.

Defence relations

Defence relations improved considerably under the military regimes of Ziaur Rahman and Hossain Mohammad Ershad in Bangladesh, which had grown more distant from its war ally, India. Common concerns over India's regional power have influenced strategic cooperation leading to a gift of several squadrons of F-6 fighter aircraft to the Bangladesh Air Force in the late 1980s.

Bilateral trade

Bilateral trade between the two countries has been growing slowly over the past years. During the eleven-year period between 2000–01 and 2010–11, Pakistan export to Bangladesh grew at an average annual rate of 27.6 percent and imports from Bangladesh grew at the rate of 9.2 percent. The total value of trade (export plus import) between the two countries in 2010-11 was about $983 million. To give a boost to bilateral trade between Pakistan and Bangladesh both countries have decided to finalise a bilateral Free Trade Agreement. FTA will pave the way for opening trade opportunity and will help expansion of trade between the two countries.

Major Pakistani exports to Bangladesh include cotton, machinery, oil, plastics and mechanical appliances. Major Bangladeshi exports to Pakistan include textiles, agricultural products, leather footwear and other leather products.

The two-way trade current stand at $340 million which was described by the Deputy High Commissioner of Bangladesh, Ruhul Alam Siddique as 'negligible when taking into account the combined population' (of both countries). Areas he hoped would induce investment from Pakistan to Bangladesh included the textiles and energy sectors.

According to State Bank of Pakistan data, Pakistan's exports to Bangladesh stood at $736 million while Bangladeshi exports to Pakistan were $44 million as of 2019.

See also

 Foreign relations of Bangladesh
 Foreign relations of Pakistan

Notes

References

Bangladesh and the Commonwealth of Nations
 
Pakistan
Bilateral relations of Pakistan
Pakistan and the Commonwealth of Nations